A great martyr (also spelled greatmartyr or great-martyr) or megalomartyr (from Byzantine Greek , , from ,  'great' + ,  'martyr'; ;) is a classification of saints who are venerated in the Eastern Orthodox Church and those Eastern Catholic Churches which follow the Rite of Constantinople. The term is also used in Malta especially by parishes dedicated to Saint George in reference to him (San Ġorġ Megalomartri).

Generally speaking, a greatmartyr is a martyr who has undergone excruciating tortures—often performing miracles and converting unbelievers to Christianity in the process—and who has attained widespread veneration throughout the Church. These saints are often from the first centuries of the Church, before the Edict of Milan. This term is normally not applied to saints who could be better described as hieromartyrs (martyred clergy) or protomartyrs (the first martyr in a given region).

Partial list of megalomartyrs
Saint Anastasia
Saint Apostolos of St. Laurence
Saint Artemius
Saint Barbara
Prince Bidzin, Prince Elizbar, and Prince Shalva of Georgia
Saint Catherine of Alexandria
Saint Christina
Saint Demetrius
Saint Euphemia
Saint Eustace
Saint George
Saint George the New at Sophia (1515)
Saint Haralambos
Saint Irene
John the New of Suceava
Ketevan, Queen of Georgia
Kostanti-Kakhay, of Georgia
Saint Lazar of Serbia
Saint Marina
Saint Menas
Saint Mercurius
Saint Michael-Gobron of Georgia
Saint Pantaleon
Saint Paraskeva
Saint Kyriaki
Saint Phanourios
Saint Procopius
Saint Sabbas the Goth
Theodore Gavra of Atran in Chaldea
Saint Theodore Stratelates
Theodore Tiron
Saint Tryphon
Xenia of Peloponnesus

See also
Hieromartyr

 
Types of saints